"We've Got It Goin' On" is the debut single of American boy band Backstreet Boys. It was released on September 11, 1995, as the lead single from their self-titled debut album. The song was recorded at Cheiron Studios in Sweden during a week in June 1995. It was written and produced by Max Martin and his then-mentor Denniz Pop, with extra writing from Herbert Crichlow and was later included in the US album and achieved success worldwide. The single peaked at number 69 on the Billboard Hot 100 and spent 20 weeks on the chart. It was released across Europe, where it reached the top five in several countries, including Austria, Belgium, France, Germany, the Netherlands, Switzerland and the United Kingdom. On the Eurochart Hot 100, the song reached number five.

Background
The group was brought over to Stockholm for a week to record the song in June 1995. However, they finished unexpectedly in just two days, which producers Max Martin and Denniz Pop then suggested recording "Quit Playing Games (with My Heart)" immediately afterwards.

Critical reception
Larry Flick from Billboard wrote that the "photogenic young male quintet looks ready to jump into the void long left open by the now-absent New Kids On The Block. They harmonize, grunt, and chant with faux-street authority over a Euro-savvy pop/jeep groove. Odds are good that they will go home winners." Dave Sholin from the Gavin Report noted that "ranging in age from 15 to 22, this Orlando-based quintet counts acts like Boyz II Men, Shai and Jodeci among their influences. The approach though is very much their own and the music fills a void on Top 40 right now. They shouldn't have to wait long to go on playlists." 

Caroline Sullivan from The Guardian commented in her review of the album, "However, they muster an unexpected guttural naughtiness on We Got It Goin' On that keeps things from hitting Boyzone-like depths of sickliness." Pan-European magazine Music & Media said, "The two cousins from Kentucky and their three Florida friends are no strangers to Boyz II Men's brand of soulful spine-chilling harmonizing, and they do it with style." They also described the song as both "up-tempo" and "infectious". A reviewer from Music Week rated it four out of five, adding, "They're America's New Kids but Backstreet Boys' first single sounds more like MN8. It's powerful, dirty, soulful and commercial enough to catch on in the UK."

Chart performance
"We've Got It Goin' On" was successful on the charts in Europe, becoming a major hit. It climbed into the Top 10 in Austria (number three), Belgium, France, Germany, the Netherlands, Scotland, Switzerland (number three) and the United Kingdom, as well as on the Eurochart Hot 100, where it reached number five. In the UK, the single peaked at number three in its second run on the UK Singles Chart, on August 18, 1996. Additionally, "We've Got It Goin' On" was a Top 20 hit in Denmark, Finland, Iceland, Ireland and Sweden. Outside Europe, it hit number 15 on the Canadian Hot 100, number 36 in New Zealand, number 69 on the US Billboard Hot 100 and number 74 in Australia. The single earned a gold record in Austria and Germany, with a sale of 15,000 and 250,000 units.

Music video
The band's first music video was filmed on August 19, 1995, in Orlando, Florida was directed by Lionel C. Martin, and is prefaced by a radio interview with the now-former on-air staffer “Hildi” on XL 106.7 (WXXL). The video itself shows the band singing at a gym, outdoors at a park area, and in a studio space, as well as dancing onstage at a club, and playing at an arcade pool hall. In an episode, Brian Littrell deserts his girlfriend washing a Jeep Grand Cherokee to play basketball, for which she takes revenge by soaking him. The scene featured Brian's actual then-girlfriend Samantha Stonebraker and her brother Steven, while AJ McLean's then girlfriend Marissa Jackson appears as the money collector during the Pool game in the video. There is also a brief cameo by Lou Pearlman.

Track listings

1995 release

 US CD and cassette single
 "We've Got It Goin' On" (radio mix) – 3:39
 "We've Got It Goin' On" (Amadin's Euro Mix) – 3:55
 "Backstreet Boys Album Medley" – 4:08

 US 12-inch single
A1. "We've Got It Goin' On" (CL's Real Butch Dub) – 8:55
A2. "We've Got It Goin' On" (Marcus' Edge Factor Dub) – 8:35
B1. "We've Got It Goin' On" (CL's Anthem Vocal Odyssey) – 8:38
B2. "We've Got It Goin' On" (Marcus' Deadly Vocal Hotmix) – 6:36

 UK and Australian CD single
 "We've Got It Goin' On" (radio edit) – 3:39
 "We've Got It Goin' On" (Hula's house mix) – 5:11
 "We've Got It Goin' On" (T and K Harlesden Mix) – 3:42
 "We've Got It Goin' On" (Amadin club mix) – 6:33
 "We've Got It Goin' On" (Hula's club mix) – 3:50

 UK 12-inch single
 "We've Got It Goin' On" (radio edit) – 3:39
 "We've Got It Goin' On" (Hula's extended house mix) – 5:12
 "We've Got It Goin' On" (T and K Harlesden Mix) – 3:42
 "We've Got It Goin' On" (Amadin club mix) – 6:33

 European CD single
 "We've Got It Goin' On" (radio edit) – 3:39
 "We've Got It Goin' On" (Hula's house mix) – 5:11

 European 7-inch single
A. "We've Got It Goin' On" (radio edit) – 3:39
B. "Tell Me That I'm Dreaming" – 4:46

1996 release

 UK CD1 and Australasian CD single
 "We've Got It Goin' On" (radio edit) – 3:39
 "We've Got It Goin' On" (Hula's house mix) – 5:11
 "Get Down" (Smokin Beats club mix) – 7:14
 "Tell Me That I'm Dreaming" – 4:40

 UK CD2
 "We've Got It Goin' On" (radio edit) – 3:39
 "We've Got It Goin' On" (Hula's club mix) – 3:50
 "We've Got It Goin' On" (Serious Rope main mix) – 7:16
 "We've Got It Goin' On" (Markus' Deadly Vocal Hot Mix) – 6:26
 "We've Got It Goin' On" (CL's Anthem Vocal Odyssey) – 8:38
 "We've Got It Goin' On" (Markus' Edge Factor Dub) – 8:35

 Japanese CD single
 "We've Got It Goin' On" (radio edit)
 "We've Got It Goin' On" (Hula's house mix)
 "Get Down" (Smokin' Beats club mix)
 "Tell Me That I'm Dreaming"
 "I'll Never Break Your Heart" (radio edit)
 "Roll with It"

Credits and personnel
 Written by Denniz Pop, Herbert Crichlow and Max Martin
 Produced by Denniz Pop and Max Martin
 Recorded and mixed at Cheiron Studios, Stockholm, Sweden

Charts

Weekly charts

Year-end charts

Certifications

Release history

References

1995 songs
1995 debut singles
Backstreet Boys songs
Songs written by Max Martin
Songs written by Denniz Pop
Jive Records singles
Songs written by Herbie Crichlow
Song recordings produced by Denniz Pop
Song recordings produced by Max Martin